Shahgarh Landscape or Shahgarh Bulge Landscape is located in Jaiselmer District in Indian state of Rajasthan. This area is protected area for reintroduction of cheetah. The nearest city to this area is Jaiselmer. This area fences along the Indo - Pak border. This area is about 4000 km2 and has about 80 human settlements each having about 5 - 10 houses. Chinkara will be the primary prey for cheetah as the prey diversity is less in this region. Cheetah have been declared extinct in India in 1952.

External links
Assessing the potential for reintroducing the cheetah in India, 2010. A report on the feasibility of cheetah reintroduction in India, jointly prepared by the Wildlife Trust of India (WTI) and Wildlife Institute of India (WII), and submitted to the Ministry of Environment and Forests, Government of India (Ranjitsinh, M. K. & Jhala, Y. V. (2010) Assessing the potential for reintroducing the cheetah in India. Wildlife Trust of India, Noida, & the Wildlife Institute of India, Dehradun, TR2010/001). Also available at WII website: , . Accessed 1 February 2011. Also available at Ministry of Environment and Forests (India) website:  Accessed 20 Sept 2011.
Project Cheetah (Brochure), September 2010, Ministry of Environment and Forests, Government of India. Accessed 1 February 2011.
 Reintroducing the Cheetah in India

Cheetah reintroduction in India
Protected areas of Rajasthan
Tourist attractions in Jaisalmer district
Protected areas with year of establishment missing